Ángel Sánchez Martín (born 15 January 1982) is a Spanish former professional footballer who played as a left-back, currently a manager.

Playing career
Born in Béjar, Province of Salamanca, Sánchez amassed Segunda División totals of 296 matches and four goals over 12 seasons, representing in the competition Deportivo Alavés, Ciudad de Murcia, Levante UD and AD Alcorcón. His best output occurred in 2010–11, when he scored twice in 36 appearances to help the latter team finish ninth in their first-ever experience at that level.

On 11 July 2015, the 33-year-old Sánchez returned to both his native region and Segunda División B, signing a two-year contract with CD Guijuelo.

Coaching career
Sánchez retired in May 2017, and immediately joined his last club's staff. On 1 June 2018, he was named first-team manager in the place of Jordi Fabregat.

Managerial statistics

References

External links

1982 births
Living people
People from Béjar
Sportspeople from the Province of Salamanca
Spanish footballers
Footballers from Castile and León
Association football defenders
Segunda División players
Segunda División B players
Deportivo Alavés B players
Deportivo Alavés players
Ciudad de Murcia footballers
Levante UD footballers
AD Alcorcón footballers
CD Guijuelo footballers
Spanish football managers
Segunda División B managers
CD Guijuelo managers